Peter Alan Quill (born 23 August 1969) is a former Australian rules footballer who played with Footscray in the Australian Football League (AFL).

Originally from Thornlie, Quill started playing for West Australian Football League club East Fremantle in 1988. He was a half forward flanker in their 1992 premiership team and amassed 78 games.

Footscray selected Quill with pick 32 in the 1992 National Draft and he would play five seasons with the club.

References

External links
 
 

1969 births
Australian rules footballers from Western Australia
Western Bulldogs players
East Fremantle Football Club players
Living people